is a Japanese comedy duo, referred to as an owarai kombi, consisting of Jin Katagiri and Kentarō Kobayashi.

Formation
Katagiri and Kobayashi met as students and formed a conte group in 1996 while studying printmaking at Tama Art University in Tokyo.  They became popular on a national scale after appearing on the NHK show On Air Battle in 1999.  Thereafter, Rahmens generally appeared for live performances on stage rather than on televised programs.  Kobayashi reported that he personally was motivated more toward stage performance because the idea of being a TV celebrity was unappealing, and did not want people coming to see him simply because of his TV presence.  Of the pair, Kobayashi is generally responsible for scriptwriting and stage direction behind the group's performances.

Their last live performance was in June 2009 during their "TOWER" tour.

Notable performances

Rahmens appeared in a regional "Get a Mac" ad campaign produced by Apple Japan, where Katagiri portrays the PC, and Kobayashi portrays the Mac.  These advertisements were similar in some respects to content in ads featuring John Hodgman and Justin Long, but some noted subtle differences in the duo's body language and tone from other "Get a Mac" commercials that were intentionally done for the sake of appealing to a Japanese audience, where ads that directly compare brands are generally not well received.

Rahmens was also featured in a series of short films called "The Japanese Tradition."  The films were directed by Junji Kojima with screenplay done by Kobayashi.  These films were comedic explanations of customs related to various topics such as sushi and apologizing.

Performances 

 First performance, "Hakoshiki [Box Type]" in 1998
 Second performance, "Hakoshiki Dainisyu [Second Box Type]" in 1998
 Third performance, "Hakoyo Saraba. [Goodbye Box Type]" in 1999
 Forth performance, "Kanzen Rippoutai~PERFECT CUBE~ [Perfect Cube]" in 1999
 Fifth performance, "home" in 2000
 Sixth performance, "FLAT" in 2000
 Seventh performance, "news" in 2001
 Eighth performance, "Tsubaki [Camellia]" in 2001
 Ninth performance, "Kujira [Whale]" in 2001
 Special performance, "Zero no Hakoshiki [Box Type of Zero]" in 2001
 Tenth performance, "Suzume [Sparrow]" in 2002
 Very special performance, "RMS1" in 2002
 Eleventh performance, "CHERRY BLOSSOM FRONT 345" in 2002
 Twelfth performance, "ATOM" in 2003
 Thirteenth performance, "CLASSIC" in 2005
 Fourteenth performance, "STUDY" in 2005
 Fifteenth performance, "Arisu [Alice]" in 2007
 "RAHEMENS PRESENTS 'GOLDEN BALLS LIVE'" in 2007
 Sixteenth performance, "TEXT" in 2007
Throughout all the performances, Kobayashi wrote and directed the script. For each performance, they performed six to ten skits for about an hour and a half. Their skits are considered to be exited in between comedy and theater, different from a complete comedy or a complete theater.  The characteristics of their skits include repeating words with the same sound but different meanings, each focusing on sound or meaning, making use of the audience's understanding of the setting of the skit, and changing individual characters and their way of performing. Their skits are made up of various elements, which create synergies and exist.

References

Japanese comedy duos
Apple Inc. advertising